C. plicata may refer to:
 Caenorhabditis plicata, a species of nematodes found in Germany
 Chaerephon plicata, the wrinkle-lipped free-tailed bat, a bat species found in Asia